The Art of Memory is a live album of improvised music by John Zorn and Fred Frith. The album was released on Derek Bailey's Incus Records in 1994.

Reception
The AllMusic review by Thom Jurek stated: "This is a revelatory album, and a near matchless collaboration".

Track listing 
All compositions by John Zorn and Fred Frith.
 "The Combiner" – 4:41
 "The Ladder" – 5:24
 "The Chain" – 4:54
 "The Field" – 7:58
 "The Table" – 8:44
 "The Interpreter" – 5:06
 "The Tree" – 4:20
 "The Fountain and the Mirror" – 4:30

Personnel 
 John Zorn – alto saxophone
 Fred Frith – guitar

References 

1994 live albums
Live free improvisation albums
John Zorn live albums
Fred Frith live albums
Collaborative albums
Incus Records live albums